The World Group II Play-offs were four ties which involved the losing nations of the World Group II and four nations from the three Zonal Group I competitions. Nations that won their play-off ties entered the 2015 World Group, while losing nations joined their respective zonal groups.

Romania vs. Serbia

Netherlands vs. Japan

Sweden vs. Thailand

Brazil vs. Switzerland

References 

World Group II Play-offs